Catherine Smithies (1785 – 1877) was an English philanthropist and campaigner for animal welfare, abolitionism and temperance. She was the creator of the first Band of Mercy, which promoted teaching children kindness towards non-human animals and led to the Bands of Mercy movement.

Biography 

In 1812, she married James Smithies at St Peter's Church, Leeds. Her son, Thomas Bywater Smithies, the second of ten children, was born in 1817.

After her husband's death, she moved to London to live with Thomas at Earlham Grove House. In the 1860s, Smithies authored A Mother's Lessons on Kindness to Animals, which was published in several volumes. In 1870, along with Angela Burdett-Coutts, she founded the Ladies Committee at the RSPCA. In 1875, she founded the first Band of Mercy.

Smithies died in 1877; on her deathbed she stated: "the teaching of children to be kind and merciful to God's lower creatures is preparing the way for the gospel of Christ." She was buried in Abney Park Cemetery in Stoke Newington, with her son Thomas (who died in 1883). A guard of honor was formed by uniformed RSPCA officers at her funeral.

After her death, Smithies was memorialised by Thomas, in issue number 281 of The British Workman. Smithies' family and friends erected an obelisk and public drinking fountain in Wood Green, London as a memorial.

References 

1785 births
1877 deaths
British animal welfare workers
Burials at Abney Park Cemetery
English abolitionists
English philanthropists
English reformers
English temperance activists
English women activists
Organization founders
Women of the Victorian era